KPU is an abbreviation that can mean:

 Kenya People's Union, a historic political party in Kenya
 Korea Polytechnic University, South Korea
 Kripke–Platek set theory with urelements, an axiom system for set theory
 Kwantlen Polytechnic University, a public university located in Surrey, British Columbia, Canada.
 Kyoto Prefectural University, Japan
 General Elections Commission (Indonesia), Komisi Pemilihan Umum
 Communist Party of Ukraine, Komunistychna Partiya Ukrayiny